The Australian Consul-General in Bali represents Australia in the Indonesian provinces of Bali, Nusa Tenggara Barat, and Nusa Tenggara Timur. The Consulate-General has its offices in Denpasar. Like the Australian consulates-general in Makassar (since 2016) and Surabaya (since 2017), the Consulate-General in Bali reports to the Australian Embassy in Jakarta, which reports to the Department of Foreign Affairs and Trade in Canberra, Australia, a process in line with the majority of Australia's consulates around the world.

Posting history
The consulate-general was first established as a consulate in 1981 in response to increasing demand for consular services by the number of Australian tourists visiting the island. The consulate was officially opened by the Australian Ambassador to Indonesia, Rawdon Dalrymple, on 30 January 1982, who noted: "The establishment of a permanent Australian Consulate here is clear recognition of the importance of that relationship [with Indonesia] and of the special place Bali occupies in the affections of the Australian people. Australians have been visiting Bali for many years, the majority as tourists. But there are others, artists and musicians for example, who have sought and found inspiration in the vitality and originality of Balinese culture and in the natural beauty of the island." The consulate was upgraded to a consulate-general in 2001, and in 2007 a new consulate-general building designed by James Cubitt Architects was opened in Denpasar.

Consuls-General

See also

 Australia–Indonesia relations
 Australian Consulate-General, Surabaya
 Embassy of Australia, Jakarta
 Ambassadors of Australia to Indonesia
 Embassy of Indonesia, Canberra
 Ambassadors of Indonesia to Australia

References

External links
Australian Consulate-General in Bali

Consuls-General
Bali
Consul-General of Australia
Consul-General of Australia